Ivan Shahriar is a Bangladeshi choreographer. He won the Bangladesh National Film Award for Best Dance Director for the film Dhat Teri Ki (2017).

Career
Shahriar leads a dance troupe called Sohag Dance Group and is the chairman of an advertising agency Exposure BD.

On 12 September 2020, Shahriar was arrested in the Niketon area of Dhaka for his alleged involvement in sex trafficking to Dubai. According to the CID officials, Shahriar and two other members of a human trafficking ring that forced young women into prostitution in Dubai after trafficking them as tourists.

Award 
Shahriar won the National Film Award for Best Choreography for Dhat Teri Ki (2017).

References

Living people
Bangladeshi choreographers
Bangladeshi male dancers
Best Choreography National Film Award (Bangladesh) winners
Year of birth missing (living people)